The Nemadji State Forest is a state forest located primarily in Pine County, Minnesota. A small portion of the forest extends into neighboring Carlton County. The eastern perimeter of the forest borders the state of Wisconsin. It is managed by the Minnesota Department of Natural Resources. Gray wolves, white-tailed deer, and eagles are present in the forest.

Geography & history
The topography of the forest varies from rolling upland sites to extensive swamps in the southern and northeastern portion of the forest. The forest is divided between two watersheds: the Willow River and Lower Tamarack River along with the southern two-thirds of the forest, eventually feed into the St. Croix River, whereas, the numerous streams in the northern one-third portion of the forest lead to Lake Superior. The area's old-growth forest was logged throughout the nineteenth century, with the Willow, Tamarack, and Nemadji Rivers being used to drive logs down the St. Croix to sawmills in Stillwater. The majority of the forest came under the ownership of the state after tax forfeitures in the early 1900s.

Recreation
Popular outdoor recreational activities are hunting, fishing and boating on lakes, birdwatching, and dispersed camping. Trails are well-developed and extensive in the forest:  trails are designated for hiking and cross-country skiing in the wintertime,  for horseback riding, with  designated for both Class I and II all-terrain vehicle and off-highway motorcycling use. Additionally, a segment of the Willard Munger State Trail, known as the "boundary segment" for its location near the Minnesota–Wisconsin border, traverses the forest.

See also
List of Minnesota state forests

References

External links
Nemadji State Forest - Minnesota Department of Natural Resources (DNR)
Nemadji State Forest Trails - MN DNR
Gandy Dancer State Trail - MN DNR
Matthew Lourey State Trail - MN DNR

Minnesota state forests
Protected areas of Pine County, Minnesota
Protected areas of Carlton County, Minnesota
Protected areas established in 1935